The 2005–06 Ukrainian Hockey League season was the 13th season of the Ukrainian Hockey League, the top level of ice hockey in Ukraine. 13 teams participated in the league, and HC Sokil Kyiv won the championship.

First round

Division A

Division B

Group A

Group B

Placing round

5th place
 HK Dnipro Kherson - HK Sumski Worony 13:5

3rd place 
 HK Meteor Dnipropetrovsk - Patriot Vinnitsya 5:3

Final 
 SDYuShOR Kharkiv - HC Donbass 1:2

Playoffs

Pre-Playoffs 
 HK ATEK Kyiv - HC Donbass 5:4, 2:1

Semifinals 
 HK Dniprovski Vovky - HK ATEK Kyiv 9:3, 5:2
 HC Berkut - HK ATEK Kyiv 12:5, +:-

Qualification
 HC Berkut - HK Dniprovski Vovky 4:0, 5:3

Final
 HC Sokil Kyiv - HC Berkut 1:4, 4:0, 5:1

External links
Ukrainian Ice Hockey Federation 
HC Levy: Archiv

UKHL
Ukrainian Hockey Championship seasons
Ukr